KKAR (104.9 FM) was a radio station licensed to serve Wamsutter, Wyoming, United States. The station, established in 2009, was owned by White Park Broadcasting, Inc. As of 2012, the station was silent. Its tower was located in the town of Wamsutter in an industrial park.

Programming
KKAR carried an oldies music radio format.

History
This station received its original construction permit from the Federal Communications Commission (FCC) on June 28, 2006. The new station was assigned the KRAN call sign by the FCC on October 30, 2006.

On March 23, 2009, White Park Broadcasting swapped call signs with KHNA, which has a construction permit for 103.3 FM broadcasting from the Warren AFB, Wyoming. KHNA received its license to cover from the FCC on May 4, 2009.

On January 7, 2013, the station changed its call sign from KHNA to KKAR.

White Park Broadcasting surrendered KKAR's license to the FCC on November 5, 2014. The FCC cancelled the license on January 30, 2015.

References

External links

KAR
Oldies radio stations in the United States
Radio stations established in 2009
Sweetwater County, Wyoming
Defunct radio stations in the United States
Radio stations disestablished in 2015
2009 establishments in Wyoming
2015 disestablishments in Wyoming
KAR